Korumburra  is a town in the Australian state of  Victoria. At the  Korumburra had an urban population of 3,639.

History
  
The Post Office in the area opened on 1 September 1884, and moved to the township on the railway survey line on 1 November 1889, the existing office being renamed Glentress. The railway arrived in 1891, and the now heritage listed railway station was built in 1908. Korumburra owed its early prosperity to coal mining; 2,000,000 tonnes of coal were produced by the Korumburra coalfields from 1893 to 1962.

The town has also enjoyed a wave of migration of European migrants who have added to the town's growth and culture. Antonio Radovick "Father of Korumburra" was the most successful Croatian pioneer in Victoria who contributed to the start and growth of the town in the 1890s and 1900s. He built the town's first hotel in 1889, and there is a street bearing his name nearby.

The township has a common incorrect spelling of its name being Kurrumburra, with 45 records shown in the World War Two Nominal Roll.

Today
Korumburra is known as the "Heritage Centre of South Gippsland". It is the home of Coal Creek Community Park and Museum. This village depicts life in the area over the period from the 1870s to 1920s, as the town rapidly expanded following the discovery of a coal seam. The outdoor museum covers 27 hectares of bushland, including 53 exhibits. These include the Giant Earthworm, National Bank, Anzac exhibit, Mining exhibits, Dairy exhibit at the Boston Carriageworks and Railway Museum. A tramway runs on weekends around the lower end of the park encompassing an old-time farm and bush oval. Many local organisations use the Park and environs and special events are held during the year.
 
Other town attractions include the Olympic pool (open November–March), a two-court basketball stadium and art gallery. The town's main industries include dairy and beef. The region is home to the world's largest earthworms. The town is also home to Burra Foods, a dairy company.

The town in conjunction with neighbouring township Bena has an Australian Rules football team competing in the West Gippsland Football League.

The town has a soccer team, the Korumburra City Soccer Club, competing in the South Gippsland Soccer League.

Golfers play at the course of the Korumburra Golf Club on Warragul Road. (In the winter of 2005, Korumburra was blanketed in snow for the first time in almost twenty years. Local residents were seen skiing the tenth fairway at the Korumburra Golf Club.)

The town is now being developed with large areas of former farm land being developed for new residential estates, which within the next ten years will expand the size and population of the township by 75 to 100 percent.

Transport

Korumburra was formerly situated along the South Gippsland railway corridor that operated to its terminus at Yarram in the early 1980s and Leongatha in the mid 1990s. A V/Line road coach service replaced the rail service on 24 July 1993, running between Melbourne and Yarram. However, since the closure of the South Gippsland rail line by the Kennett Victorian government on 14 December 1994, the South and West Gippsland Transport Group represented by the local council are campaigning for the rail services to be reinstated beyond the current terminus at Cranbourne by the 2020s.  The line beyond Leongatha is being used as a rail trail for public use and also the former Wonthaggi line. Dandenong - Cranbourne is being used by the Melbourne Suburban train company, while the section beyond Cranbourne - Nyora is in an unusable state for trains to operate and is yet to have its fate decided.

Earthquakes
No damage was reported.

As of 2 April 2009, fifteen earthquakes and aftershocks have been recorded around the town during 2009.

On 5 July 2011, a magnitude 4.4 earthquake with the epicentre on Korumburra was felt over much of suburban Melbourne as well.

Notable people
Notable people from Korumburra include:
 Air Vice Marshal Francis Masson (Frank) Bladin, CB, CBE, distinguished airman in World War II and the post-war period.
 Bruce Hungerford, pianist
 Ken Lay, former Chief Commissioner of Victoria Police
 William Langham Proud CBE (28 January 1909 – December 1984), architect and co-founder in Geelong of Apex Clubs of Australia.
 Lieutenant General Sir Stanley George Savige, KBE, CB, DSO, MC, ED distinguished soldier in World War I and World War II, founder of Legacy
 Jill Singer, journalist, columnist and television presenter
Captain Boomerang (George "Digger" Harkness), fictional super-villain appearing in DC comics from the town of Kurrumburra
Ron Strykert Co-founder, lead guitarist and songwriter for Men At Work.

See also
 Korumburra railway station

References

External links

Mining towns in Victoria (Australia)
Towns in Victoria (Australia)
Shire of South Gippsland